The Potez 220 was a prototype French twin-engined, three-seat reconnaissance and army cooperation aircraft. Two examples were built in 1939, but no production followed.

Design and development
On 6 February 1937, the French air ministry issued specification A.24 for a three-seat reconnaissance and army-cooperation aircraft. To meet this requirement, the nationalised Société Nationale de Constructions Aéronautiques du Nord (SNCAN), formed in January 1937 from ANF Les Mureaux, Potez, Chantiers Aéro-Maritimes de la Seine and parts of Breguet and Amiot, gave the task to the design team inherited from Les Mureaux. Their design, the Potez 220 was a twin-engined monoplane of all-metal construction. The fuselage was an oval-section monocoque, which accommodated the aircraft's crew of three, consisting of a pilot, a radio operator gunner and an observer, with a glazed gondola slung under the fuselage provided for the observer. It was powered by two  Gnome-Rhône 14M radial engines driving three-bladed propellers, which were fed from fuel tanks located within the wing. A retractable tailwheel undercarriage was fitted.

The first prototype made its maiden flight at Sartrouville on 7 April 1939, with the second prototype following on 20 October that year. Performance was slightly better than the Potez 63.11, which had recently entered production in the reconnaissance role, while orders had also been placed for the much more powerful and better-performing Bloch 174 and Martin 167F aircraft to meet the same requirement as the Potez 220. Development of the type was therefore abandoned.

Specifications

Notes

References

 

1930s French military reconnaissance aircraft
070
Aircraft first flown in 1939
Twin piston-engined tractor aircraft